Peter Poole (c. 1932 – 18 August 1960 in Nairobi, Kenya) was a British-born Kenyan engineer and shop owner.  He was the only white in Kenya to be executed for killing an indigenous African person.

On 12 October 1959, he was charged with killing Kamawe Musunge, his houseboy, in Gordon Road, Nairobi.  Musunge had been riding a bicycle when Poole's two dogs stopped him.  Musunge threw stones at one dog, for which Poole shot him dead with a Luger pistol. Poole was executed on 18 August 1960.  At the time Kenya was still under British rule, and the verdict was received negatively by some white settlers in the region.

Poole had emigrated to Kenya from Essex. He owned an electrical shop on Nairobi's Government Road (now Moi Avenue). Poole served in the British Army during the Mau Mau Uprising. He was married with two children.

See also 
Thomas Cholmondeley, white Kenyan found guilty of manslaughter

References 

British military personnel of the Mau Mau Uprising
20th-century British Army personnel
Executed Kenyan people
People executed by British Kenya by hanging
Executed English people
Kenyan murderers
English people convicted of murder
1932 births
1960 deaths
British people executed abroad